USS Susanne has been the name of more than one United States Navy ship, and may refer to:

, a patrol vessel in commission from 1917 to 1919
, the proposed name and designation for a vessel the Navy considered for service during World War I but never acquired

See also

Susanne, USS